Felipe Enrique "Henry" Lapuz Gozon (born December 8, 1939), is a Filipino lawyer and the chairman and CEO of GMA Network Inc., one of the largest media networks in the Philippines.

A lawyer by profession, the Yale-educated Gozon is seen as the network executive who has successfully turned-around GMA from its state as the one of the leading television networks in the Philippines to its current stature, at some point toppling the long-dominant ABS-CBN in 1997 and 2004 from their nationwide stronghold until today in the Mega Manila ratings. Under his watch, the network has also experienced stability in terms of revenues, mostly from advertising and other revenue sources.

Career
Atty. Felipe L. Gozon obtained a Bachelor of Laws degree from the University of the Philippines in 1962. He placed 13th during the 1963 Philippine Bar Examination. He obtained his Masters of Laws degree from Yale University in 1965. He is a senior partner in the law firm of Belo Gozon Elma Parel Asuncion & Lucila.

As a distinguished aviation lawyer, he was a member of the Philippine Air Negotiating Panel and is cited in the Asia Pacific Legal 500 as a leading expert in this field.

His business experience includes acting as a director of the International Corporate Bank and as chairman of Marcopper Mining Corporation. Atty. Gozon has been the chairman of the board of directors of the company since 1975. He currently holds the positions of chairman, president and chief executive officer. Since assuming leadership of the company in October 2000, the company’s ratings have improved greatly, surpassing its nearest competitor in 2003. Atty. Gozon was named CEO of the Year by UNO Magazine in 2004 and Master Entrepreneur of the Year (Philippines) 2004 by SGV & Co./Ernst & Young in 2005. People Asia Magazine included him in the list of People of the Year 2005. He is also currently chairman, vice-chairman or director of several other institutions such as the Malayan Bank Savings & Mortgage Bank, the Children’s Museum and Library, Inc., Asian Institute of Journalism and Communication and the Nova Foundation for Differently Abled Persons, Inc. He is also a director and/or chairman of some of the subsidiaries and affiliates of the company, such as GMA New Media, GMA Films, Alta Productions, Citynet, GMA Marketing and Productions, Inc., Scenarios, Inc., EMC Network, Inc., GMA Kapuso Foundation, INQ7 Interactive, Inc., GMA Records, Mont-Aire and Kapwa Ko Mahal Ko.

Gozon was among the 61 awardees that included Reynato Puno, who were honored as UP’s distinguished alumni by the UP Alumni Association (UPAA) at the Araneta Coliseum on June 21, 2008. Gozon received an award for the Lapuz-Gozon family whose members up to the third generation studied in UP.

Awards

2015
Global Leadership Award for Excellence in Media Sector (The first Filipino recipient of this international award), The Leaders International together with the American Leadership Development Association (ALDA)

2014
Ulirang Ama Award, National Mother’s Day and Father’s Day Foundation, Inc.

2013
Distinguished Achievement Award, International Honor Society of Phi Kappa Phi University of the Philippines Chapter (045)

2012
Certificate of Recognition, Civil Aeronautics Board (Philippines)
Platinum Business Icon Award, BizNews Asia
Lifetime Distinguished Achievement Award, University of the Philippines Alumni Association (UPAA)

2011
Tycoon of the Decade, BizNews Asia
Outstanding Manilan, City Government of Manila

2009
Business Excellence Award, BizNews Asia

2005
People of the Year Award, Asia Magazine

2004
CEO of the Year Award, UNO Magazine
Master Entrepreneur Award, SGV/Ernst & Young

1993
Presidential Award of Merit, Philippine Bar Association

1991
Chief Justice Special Award, Chief Justice of the Supreme Court of the Philippines

1990
Presidential Award of Merit, Philippine Bar Association

References

Living people
Filipino chief executives
GMA Network (company) executives
Filipino Protestants
20th-century Filipino lawyers
University of the Philippines Diliman alumni
De La Salle University alumni
People from Ermita
1939 births
Yale Law School alumni
Chairmen of GMA Network
Aviation lawyers
Filipino chairpersons of corporations